An Athenian is a citizen or resident of modern or ancient Athens. As an adjective, it refers to anything associated with Athens.

Athenian may also refer to:

 James "Athenian" Stuart (1713–1788), Scottish archaeologist, architect and artist
 Athenian School, a college preparatory and boarding school in Danville, California, United States
 Athenian Motorsports, an American professional stock car racing team from 2014 to 2016
 Athenian League an English amateur football league for clubs in and around London from 1912 to 1984
 The Athenian (magazine), an English-language magazine published in Greece from 1974 to 1993
 Athenian, an American newspaper that was merged into The Daily Post Athenian